

Owners

Presidents

General Managers
Bob Quinn
John Quinn
John McHale
Paul Richards
Eddie Robinson
John Alevizos
Bill Lucas
John Mullen
Bobby Cox
John Schuerholz
Frank Wren
John Hart
John Coppolella
Alex Anthopoulos

Other executives
Hank Aaron
Jim Fanning
Bill Lajoie
Chuck LaMar
Ricky Mast
Wid Matthews
Dayton Moore
Paul Snyder
Dean Taylor
David Wilder

References

External links
Baseball America: Executive Database

 
 
Lists of Major League Baseball owners and executives
Owners